VES may refer to:

Society
 Venezuelan  (ISO 4217 code VES), the currency of Venezuela beginning in 2018

Science and technology
 Video Entertainment System, second generation video games console
 Vertical electrical sounding, geophysical investigation technique
 Virtual Execution System

Organisations

Educational
 Virginia Episcopal School, Lynchburg, Virginia, United States
 Vivekananda Educational Society, Chennai, Tamil Nadu, India

Other
 Voluntary Euthanasia Society, former name of Dignity in Dying
 Vieques Air Link (ICAO Code: VES)
 Visual Effects Society

See also
 Devínska Nová Ves, a borough of Bratislava, Slovakia
 Karlova Ves, a borough of Bratislava, Slovakia
 VE (disambiguation)